Erick Eugene Allen (born October 5, 1975) is a member of the Georgia House of Representatives and a member of the Democratic Party representing district 40.

Personal life and education 
Allen was born in Nashville, Tennessee. After graduating high school, Allen attended Volunteer State College in Gallatin, Tennessee where he received an associate's degree in secondary education. He later went on to receive a bachelor's degree in human and organizational development from Belmont University and a master's in business administration from Kennesaw State University.

Allen is married to Dr. Tameka Allen, an Orthodontist, and has one daughter Elise.

Career 
In 2002, Allen moved to Atlanta, Georgia where he met his future bride and now wife, Dr. Tameka Allen. They married in September 2010. Since arriving in Georgia, Allen has worked as a self-employed consultant focusing on workforce performance and development.

Allen first ran for Georgia House in 2014 against Republican incumbent Rich Golick, and  again in 2016 before defeating Golick in 2018.

Rep. Allen was named the 2021 Legislator of the year by the Georgia Mental Health Consumer network for his advocacy and work in Mental Health. in 2019 the Georgia Council on Substance Abuse renamed their advocate of the year award the Erick Allen Advocate of the Year award in recognition of Rep. Allen's work to secure legislation for a specialized Georgia Recovers license plate and for starting the Legislative Working Group on Addiction and Recovery (only the 3rd in the country at the time).

He is a candidate for the 2022 Georgia lieutenant gubernatorial election.

Committees 
Allen serves as a member on the Banks & Banking, Code Revision, Insurance, Economic Development & Tourism, and Human Relations & Aging committees.

Previous Endorsements 
President Barack Obama, President Joe Biden, Vice President Kamala Harris, Gov. Roy Barnes, Atty. General Eric Holder, Stacey Abrams, Sierra Club, NARAL, PPSE, Educators First, GA AFL-CIO, Moms Demand Action Gun Sense Candidate

References 

1975 births
Living people
Democratic Party members of the Georgia House of Representatives
Politicians from Atlanta
Politicians from Nashville, Tennessee
Belmont University alumni
Kennesaw State University alumni
21st-century American politicians
African-American state legislators in Georgia (U.S. state)
21st-century African-American politicians
20th-century African-American people